John Victor Wassall (11 February 1917 – April 1994) was an English footballer who played as a forward. Born in Shrewsbury, Shropshire, he played for Wellington Town, Manchester United and Stockport County.

External links
Profile at MUFCInfo.com

1917 births
1994 deaths
English footballers
Sportspeople from Shrewsbury
Telford United F.C. players
Manchester United F.C. players
Stockport County F.C. players
Association football forwards